Skin Deep is a 1929 American pre-Code drama film directed by Ray Enright and starring Monte Blue. It was produced and distributed by the Warner Brothers. It was also released in the U.S. in a silent version for theaters not equipped yet with sound. The film is a remake of a 1922 Associated First National silent film of the same name directed by Lambert Hillyer and starring Milton Sills.

Plot
Gangster Joe Daley marries a chorus girl named Sadie, and decides to give up the rackets and surrender $100,000 to the DA . For this she turns on him and goes in with Blackie Culver, a rival gang lord, and they set Joe up to take the rap for stealing it. Joe is sent to prison, still unaware of Sadie's betrayal. She makes Joe believe the DA wants her, and he must save her by escaping. He does, and injures his face in the break out. Farm girl Elsa Langdon has her surgeon father remake his face. Now unrecognizable, Joe learns of Sadie's plot. and returns to the city.

Cast
Monte Blue as Joe Daley
Betty Compson as Sadie Rogers
Davey Lee as District Atty. Carlson's son
Alice Day as Elsa Langdon
John Davidson as Blackie Culver
John Bowers as District Atty. Carlson
Georgie Stone as Dippy
Tully Marshall as Dr. Bruce Landon
Robert Perry as Tim

Preservation status
All copies of this film are now lost. However, the Vitaphone soundtrack, of music and effects, survive for the silent version.

See also
List of early Warner Bros. sound and talking features
Betty Compson filmography

References

External links

Page devoted to Skin Deep (Vitaphone Varieties)
lobby card

1929 films
Films directed by Ray Enright
Warner Bros. films
Lost American films
Remakes of American films
Sound film remakes of silent films
1929 drama films
1929 lost films
Lost drama films
1920s English-language films
1920s American films